Events from the year 1826 in Denmark.

Incumbents
 Monarch – Frederick VI
 Prime minister – Otto Joachim

Events

Undated
 Gold coins denominated as "Frederiks d'Or" (later as "Christians d'Or") are introduced.

Culture

Art
 Wilhelm Bendz paints A Young Artist Examining a Sketch in a Mirror-

Births
 14 February – Frederik Christian Lund, painter and illustrator (died 1901)
 16 February
 Anton Eduard Kieldrup, landscape painter (died 1869)
 Hans Peter Jørgen Julius Thomsen, lawyer (died 1909)
 27 February  Louise Westergaard, pedagogue and educator (died 1880)
 13 May – Clara Andersen, dramatist and novelist (died 1895)
 18 June  Niels Frederik Ravn, politician (died 1910)
 5 August  Andreas Aagesen, jurist (died 1879)
 24 August – Fritz Melbye, marine painter (died 1869)

Deaths
 16 March  Poul de Løvenørn, naval officer (born 1751)
 24 March  Georg Nikolaus von Nissen, diplomat and music historian (born 1761)
 1 October – Margrethe von der Lühe, courtier (born 1741)
 3 October – Jens Immanuel Baggesen, poet (born 1764)
 27 November  Niels Peder Christian Holsøe, architect (died 1895)
 14 December  Conrad Malte-Brunm, geographer and journalist (norn 1775)
 20 December – Jens Juel-Vind, chamberlain and landowner (born 1794)
 28 December  Schack von Staffeldt, author (born 1769)

References

 
1820s in Denmark
Denmark
Years of the 19th century in Denmark